The Hollywood Music in Media Award for Best Original Song in a Sci-Fi, Fantasy or Horror Film is one of the awards given annually to people working in the motion picture industry by the Hollywood Music in Media Awards (HMMA). It is presented to the songwriters who have composed the best "original" song, written specifically for a film. The award was first given in 2016, during the seventh annual awards. It was discontinued in 2019, with nominees simply separated by live-action, animation and documentary.

Winners and nominees

2010s

References

Best Original Song in a Sci-Fi, Fantasy or Horror Film
Film awards for Best Song